The Harringay Tigers were a motorcycle speedway team who raced at the Harringay Stadium from 1934 until 1939 in the National League Division One.

History
The Tigers were the second of three speedway teams to be based at Harringay. From 1929 to 1931 the team were called the Harringay Canaries.

The Tigers finished runner-up in the 1935 Speedway National League. Racing ceased in 1939 because of World War II, the Tigers were in 5th position at the time.  

The stadium reopened on 4 April 1947 at which point the team were revived as the Harringay Racers.

Notable Harringay Tigers riders

Season summary

+ 5th when league was suspended

References

Defunct British speedway teams
Speedway teams in London